Nasser bin Hamad Al-Manqour (April 1930, Sudair - July 24, 2007, London) was a Saudi politician and diplomat who held several positions, including Director of King Saud University and Minister of Labor and Social Affairs. Al-Manqour was also served the Saudi ambassador to Spain, United Kingdom, Ireland, and Sweden.

Biography 
Nasser Al-Manqour was born in April 1930 in Sudair of Saudi Arabia. he completed his education in Mecca and did graduating from the Cairo University with honours in literature. Al-Manqour served as Ambassador to Japan, Sweden, and Spain and United Kingdom.

He began his career at the Ministry of Foreign Affairs. He became director-general of Education in 1956 and was appointed director of the University of Riyadh in 1958.

Al-Manqour died in a hospital in London on July 24, 2007, after a struggle with illness.

Bibliography

References 

2007 deaths
1930 births
Ambassadors of Saudi Arabia to Ireland
Ambassadors of Saudi Arabia to Spain
Ambassadors of Saudi Arabia to the United Kingdom
Ambassadors of Saudi Arabia to Sweden
Cairo University alumni